Shasan is a village and a gram panchayat in the Barasat II CD block in the Barasat Sadar subdivision of the North 24 Parganas district in the state of West Bengal, India.

Geography

Location

Area overview
The area covered in the map alongside is largely a part of the north Bidyadhari Plain. located in the lower Ganges Delta. The country is flat. It is a little raised above flood level and the highest ground borders the river channels. 54.67% of the people of the densely populated area lives in the urban areas and 45.33% lives in the rural  areas.

Note: The map alongside presents some of the notable locations in the subdivision. All places marked in the map are linked in the larger full screen map.

Civic administration

Police station
Shashan police station serves a total population of 139,328. It has jurisdiction over Barasat II CD block.

Demographics
According to the 2011 Census of India, Sasan had a total population of 5,818, of which 2,957 (51%) were males and 2,861 (49%) were females. Population in the age range 0–6 years was 776. The total number of literate persons in Sasan was 3,948 (78.30% of the population over 6 years).

Transport
Local roads connect Shasan to State Highway 2 (locally known as Taki Road).

Sondalia, a station on the Barasat-Hasnabad line, which is part the Kolkata Suburban Railway railway system, is located nearby.

Healthcare
Mitpukuria primary health centre at Shasan functions with 10 beds.

References

Villages in North 24 Parganas district